Viziru is a commune located in the central part of Brăila County, Muntenia, Romania. It is composed of two villages, Lanurile and Viziru.

The commune is traversed by the DN21 road, linking the county seat, Brăila, to Slobozia. It is crossed the 45th parallel north.

Natives
 Costică Dafinoiu
 Gheorghe Dogărescu

References

Communes in Brăila County
Localities in Muntenia